Yodha is an upcoming Hindi language action thriller film, written and directed by Sakar, and produced by Karan Johar, under the banner of Dharma Productions. The film stars Sidharth Malhotra, Disha Patani and Raashi Khanna. 

The film was initially planned for a theatrical release on 11th November 2022, but was later pushed to 2023. Yodha is scheduled for theatrical release on 7 July 2023, with official announcement made on 30th November 2022, coinciding with Raashii Khanna's birthday.

Cast 
 Sidharth Malhotra
 Disha Patani
 Raashii Khanna

Production  
Principal photography began on 27 November 2021. On 18 December 2021, Disha Patani and Raashii Khanna were announced as the leading actresses. In December 2021, Patani wrapped up her portion of the shoot and later unwrapped it to write a rap song for Badshah. In March 2022, Raashii Khanna wrapped up her portions and parceled it home.

Release
The film was scheduled to be released on 11 November 2022 but got delayed because product was sub-par, its first ever made aerial action comedy, where the antagonist hijack the flight and Sidharth character Yodha is sent to rescue. But due to budget constraints, instead of real flight they used paper plane and VFX. Now it is scheduled to release on 7 July 2023.

References

External links
 
 

Upcoming Indian films
Upcoming Hindi-language films